József Sütő (born 9 September 1937) is a Hungarian former long-distance runner. He competed in the marathon at the 1964 Summer Olympics and the 1968 Summer Olympics.

References

External links
 

1937 births
Living people
Athletes (track and field) at the 1964 Summer Olympics
Athletes (track and field) at the 1968 Summer Olympics
Hungarian male long-distance runners
Hungarian male marathon runners
Olympic athletes of Hungary
People from Makó
Sportspeople from Csongrád-Csanád County
20th-century Hungarian people